Cyrioctea is a genus of spiders in the family Zodariidae. It was first described in 1889 by Simon. , it contains 14 African and South American species.

Species
Cyrioctea comprises the following species:
Cyrioctea aschaensis Schiapelli & Gerschman, 1942
Cyrioctea calderoni Platnick, 1986
Cyrioctea cruz Platnick, 1986
Cyrioctea griswoldorum Platnick & Jocqué, 1992
Cyrioctea hirsuta Platnick & Griffin, 1988
Cyrioctea islachanaral Grismado & Pizarro-Araya, 2016
Cyrioctea lotzi Jocqué, 2013
Cyrioctea marken Platnick & Jocqué, 1992
Cyrioctea mauryi Platnick, 1986
Cyrioctea namibensis Platnick & Griffin, 1988
Cyrioctea raveni Platnick & Griffin, 1988
Cyrioctea sawadee Jocqué, 2013
Cyrioctea spinifera (Nicolet, 1849)
Cyrioctea whartoni Platnick & Griffin, 1988

References

Zodariidae
Araneomorphae genera
Spiders of Africa
Spiders of South America